Enso Rodrigo Villamayor (born 2 October 1995) is a Paraguayan professional footballer who plays as a forward for 3 de Febrero.

Career
Villamayor had a youth spell with Cerro Corá. He began his senior career with Sportivo Luqueño. He made his professional bow in the Primera División versus Nacional on 12 March 2016, which preceded his first goals coming a week later as he netted a brace in a 2–2 draw at home to Deportivo Capiatá. Further goals came against General Díaz, River Plate, Nacional and General Caballero as the club finished eighth to qualify for the Copa Sudamericana. After just two total appearances for them in 2017, Villamayor left on loan in June 2017 to Independiente. A total of seven appearances followed with the Asunción team.

In August 2018, months after a stint with Resistencia in the División Intermedia, Villamayor switched Paraguay for Argentina after agreeing a move to All Boys of Primera B Metropolitana. His debut came in a 1–0 win over Talleres in October, with three more matches following. Villamayor left All Boys at the end of 2018, subsequently securing a contract back in his homeland with 3 de Febrero on 3 March 2019.

Career statistics
.

References

External links

1995 births
Living people
People from Cordillera Department
Paraguayan footballers
Association football forwards
Paraguayan expatriate footballers
Expatriate footballers in Argentina
Paraguayan expatriate sportspeople in Argentina
Paraguayan Primera División players
Primera B Metropolitana players
Sportivo Luqueño players
Independiente F.B.C. footballers
Resistencia S.C. footballers
All Boys footballers
Club Atlético 3 de Febrero players